Little Walter (1930–1968) was an American blues artist who is generally regarded as the most influential blues harmonica player of his era. Most of his earliest recordings were as a sideman, when he contributed harmonica to songs by Chicago blues musicians such as Jimmy Rogers and Muddy Waters.  As the featured artist, he recorded the instrumental "Juke" in 1952. The single reached number one on the Billboard Rhythm and Blues chart and launched his career as a solo artist.

A string of popular singles followed, including "Mean Old World", "Blues with a Feeling", and "Key to the Highway". His "My Babe" was one of the biggest R&B sellers of 1955. In addition to his solo career, Little Walter continued to record harmonica for songs by other artists. His harmonica can be heard on many of Muddy Waters' most famous songs, such as "I'm Your Hoochie Coochie Man", "I Just Want to Make Love to You", and "Got My Mojo Working".

Little Walter recorded at a time when blues musicians were primarily singles artists. His records were released on Checker Records, run by the Chess brothers, Leonard and Phil. The one album released during his lifetime is a compilation issued by Chess Records, titled The Best of Little Walter (1958). Rolling Stone magazine ranked it at number 198 in its list of the "500 Greatest Albums of All Time". Little Walter died in 1968, a time when interest in electric blues shifted the focus from singles to albums. Chess continued to issue compilations of his earlier singles as well as previously unreleased recordings. In 2009, The Complete Chess Masters: 1950–1967 was issued by the Checker/Chess successor, Hip-O Records/Universal. The five compact disc box set contains 126 recordings and is believed to represent all of his solo recordings. In 2010, the set received a Grammy Award for Best Historical Album.

Singles 
Most of Little Walter's first recordings from 1947 to 1951 were as a harmonica player backing bluesmen, such as Jimmy Rogers, Sunnyland Slim, and Muddy Waters.  However, a few songs recorded during this period were issued on singles, which were credited to Little Walter. These include releases on Chance Records (as "Little Walter J."), and Parkway and Regal (as "Little Walter Trio"). After Leonard and Phil Chess began promoting him as a featured artist on their Checker label in 1952, his singles were variously credited as "Little Walter and His Night Cats", "Little Walter and His Nightcaps", "Little Walter and His Jukes", or simply "Little Walter". These singles were issued on 78 rpm and 45 rpm records, when they were the standard formats.

Selected compilation albums 
As with most blues musicians before the mid-1960s, Little Walter was a singles artist. The one album released during his lifetime, the compilation Best of Little Walter, was issued on the Checker-affiliated Chess Records in 1958. After his death, additional songs were compiled on albums, sometimes by other record companies without authorization or, as author Richie Unterberger noted, the "legality was dubious". The compilation albums listed are issued by Chess and its successors.

As accompanist

Singles

Albums
Songs recorded with Little Walter as a sideman are included on many compilations by Muddy Waters and Jimmy Rogers. Albums with four songs recorded live in the late 1960s have been released by several issuers of bootleg recordings. These often appear along with songs by Otis Rush on albums with titles such as Live in the Windy City and At the Chicago Blues Festival. Additional live recordings from the 1967 American Folk Blues Festival have circulated on unofficial sources.

Notes
Footnotes

Citations

References

Discographies of American artists
Blues discographies